American hip hop duo M.O.P. have released six studio albums, three compilation albums, one mixtape, one extended play (EP) and twenty-seven singles (including eight as a featured artist).

Albums

Studio albums

Compilation albums

Mixtapes

Extended plays

Singles

As lead artist

As featured artist

Guest appearances

Music videos

Notes

References

External links
 
 
 

Hip hop discographies
Discographies of American artists